The Dance is a live album by the British-American rock band Fleetwood Mac, released on 19 August 1997. It hailed the return of the band's most successful lineup of Lindsey Buckingham, Mick Fleetwood, Christine McVie, John McVie, and Stevie Nicks, who had not released an album together since 1987's Tango in the Night, a decade earlier. It was the first Fleetwood Mac release to top the U.S. album charts since 1982's Mirage.

History
Recorded during a concert on 23 May 1997, The Dance was the last Fleetwood Mac album to feature Christine McVie as a full-time member before she left a year after the album's release although she returned to the band in 2014 to tour. Debuting at No. 1 on the Billboard 200 with sales of 199,000, The Dance became the fifth best-selling live album of all time in the United States, selling a million copies within eight weeks, spending more than seven months within the top 40, and eventually selling over 6,000,000 copies worldwide. The DVD version has been certified 9× platinum in Australia for selling 135,000 copies. The 44 date tour grossed $36 million.

Unlike 1980's Live, which was a collection of live recordings over a series of 60 shows, The Dance was recorded in one night, albeit with good isolation to allow for overdubs. The concert was recorded for Fleetwood Mac's MTV  The Dance special at Warner Brothers Studios in Burbank, California, and features the University of Southern California Marching Band who perform on the tracks "Tusk" (having played on the original studio recording) and "Don't Stop".

Although the album is predominantly a live greatest hits package, The Dance also features new material written by each of the primary songwriting members of the band (with two from Buckingham) as well as popular album tracks. For example, "Bleed to Love Her" was a previously unreleased track when The Dance was released, although a studio recording of the song was later included on the Say You Will (2003) album. No tracks from the Mirage album were included on the CD, although "Gypsy" was included in the video and DVD versions.

A banjo was played during this recording of "Say You Love Me", an interesting difference from the original album version. Also John McVie sang backup on this version of the song.

The album was titled for Henri Matisse's painting, Dance, which was at one point supposed to be used as the album cover but couldn't be licensed. The album cover photo, taken by David LaChapelle, has Mick Fleetwood recreating his pose from the cover of Rumours, the band's most successful album, and Lindsey Buckingham holding the cane used on the cover of the Fleetwood Mac album, Rumours' predecessor.

This album spawned three singles in the USA: "Landslide", "The Chain", and "Silver Springs" which earned the band three Grammy nominations in 1998, in the categories of "Best Pop Album", "Best Rock Performance by a Group or Duo with Vocal" for "The Chain" and "Best Pop Performance by a Duo or Group with Vocals" for "Silver Springs". A fourth single, "Temporary One," was released in some European markets.

The band later embarked on a 44-date tour across the United States with one stop in Canada in support of The Dance. The setlist was similar to that of the album, but with "Over My Head" and "My Little Demon" being replaced by "Oh Daddy", "Second Hand News", "Stand Back", "Farmer's Daughter" (a cover of the Beach Boys song from Surfin' U.S.A.), and "Not That Funny". "Eyes of the World" was played instead of "Second Hand News" on opening night in Hartford, Connecticut.

CD track listing

DVD/Video track listing
The DVD video is in 1.33:1 aspect ratio, while audio is in Dolby Digital 5.1 and PCM stereo.
 "The Chain" (Buckingham, Fleetwood, C. McVie, J. McVie, Nicks)
 "Dreams" (Nicks)
 "Everywhere" (C. McVie)
 "Gold Dust Woman" (Nicks) * ***
 "I'm So Afraid" (Buckingham)**
 "Temporary One" (C. McVie, Quintela)
 "Bleed to Love Her" (Buckingham)
 "Gypsy" (Nicks) * ***
 "Big Love" (Buckingham) **
 "Go Insane" (Buckingham) * ** ***
 "Landslide" (Nicks)
 "Say You Love Me" (C. McVie)
 "You Make Loving Fun" (C. McVie)
 "My Little Demon" (Buckingham)
 "Silver Springs" (Nicks) *** ****
 "Over My Head" (C. McVie) * ***
 "Rhiannon" (Nicks)
 "Sweet Girl" (Nicks)
 "Go Your Own Way" (Buckingham) ***
 "Tusk" (Buckingham)
 "Don't Stop" (C. McVie)
 "Songbird" (C. McVie) * ***

* Exclusive to the VHS/DVD/Laserdisc versions

** Later released on the 2-CD US version of The Very Best of Fleetwood Mac

*** Live version released as a B-side of a single

**** Later released (as an edited version) on the 3-CD Deluxe three-disc edition of 50 Years – Don't Stop

Personnel
Fleetwood Mac
 Stevie Nicks – vocals, tambourine
 Lindsey Buckingham – vocals, guitars, banjo on "Say You Love Me"
 Christine McVie – vocals, keyboards, acoustic piano, accordion on "Tusk", tambourine on "Say You Love Me", maracas on "Everywhere"
 John McVie – bass guitar, backing vocals on "Say You Love Me"
 Mick Fleetwood – drums, percussion

Additional musicians
 Scott Pinkerton – synthesizer programming
 Brett Tuggle – keyboards, guitars, backing vocals
 Neale Heywood – guitars, backing vocals
 Lenny Castro – percussion
 Sharon Celani – backing vocals
 Mindy Stein – backing vocals
 Dr. Arthur C. Bartner – director of the USC Trojan Marching Band

Fleetwood Mac crew
 Marty Hom – tour manager
 Paul Chavarria – production manager
 Sam Emerson - stage manager
 Edd Kolakowski – piano tech
 Ray Lindsey – guitar tech
 Todd Bowie – guitar tech
 Steve Dikun – bass tech
 Walter Earl – drum tech
 Mike Fasano – drum tech
 Bruce Jackson – FOH sound
 Chris Lantz – monitors
 Chris Fulton – Clair Bros.
 Mark Dowdle – Clair Bros.
 Kim Brakeley – wardrobe stylist
 Jill Focke – assistant wardrobe
 Margi Kent – clothing designer for Nicks
 Barbara Buck – makeup
 Elaine Offers – makeup
 Karen Johnston – assistant to Nicks
 Steve Real – vocal coach
 Sara Sierra – hair
 Robert Ramos – hair
 Richard Perea – assistant/runner
 Mark Candelario, Jen Dreisen – runners
 Edward O'Hickey III – WB stage
 Fred Hammond, Jim Callahan – WB security

CD production
 Lindsey Buckingham – producer
 Elliot Scheiner – producer, engineer, mixing
 Barry Goldberg – engineer
 Guy Charbonneau – additional engineer
 Charlie Bouis – assistant engineer
 John Nelson – assistant engineer
 Paul DeCarli – digital editing
 Scott Humphrey – digital editing
 Ted Jensen – mastering at Sterling Sound (New York, NY)
 Ted Barela – technical assistance
 David Gallo – technical assistance
 Eric Johnston – technical assistance
 Ph. D – art direction, design
 David LaChapelle – photography
 Neal Preston – photography

Video production
 Bruce Gower – director
 Lindsey Buckingham – producer
 Elliot Scheiner – producer, recording, mixing 
 Barry Goldberg – recording
 David LaChapelle – photography
 Neal Preston – photography
 Dr. Arthur C. Bartner – director of the USC Marching Band

Charts

Weekly charts

Year-end charts

Singles

Certifications

Album release

Video release

References

Albums produced by Lindsey Buckingham
Fleetwood Mac live albums
Live video albums
1997 live albums
Reprise Records live albums
Reprise Records video albums